Chinna Raja is a 1999 Indian Tamil-language thriller film directed and produced by Chitra Lakshmanan. The film stars Karthik in dual lead roles  whilst Roja, Priya Raman and Manivannan play supporting roles. The film released on 12 February 1999.

Cast
Karthik as Raja and Dilip (dual role)
Roja as Radha
Priya Raman as Priya
Manivannan as Mani
Dhamu 
Ramesh Khanna 
Mohan Raman 
Manobala
Vaiyapuri
Jaishankar
Sowcar Janaki
Chitra Lakshmanan

Production
The lead heroine was initially meant to be played by Pooja Kumar, who was later seen in Kadhal Rojavae (2000) and Vishwaroopam (2013).

Soundtrack
Soundtrack was composed by Deva and lyrics written by Kalidasan and Arivumathi.

Release
The film was initially scheduled to release on 19 October 1998, two months after the release of the Karthik-Roja starrer Unnidathil Ennai Koduthen, to coincide with Diwali. However, it was delayed by five months, and the film eventually released on 12 February 1999.

References

1999 films
1990s Tamil-language films
Twins in Indian films
Indian action thriller films
Films scored by Deva (composer)
1999 action thriller films